is a Japanese film director and screenwriter known for his violent thriller-horror film series All Night Long.

Life and career
Matsumura was born in Tokyo, Japan in 1963. After graduating college, he entered the film industry where he worked on documentary films and short documentaries. His documentary on continued pollution in the Doroku area won the grand prize in the Short Film category at the Mainichi Film Concours in 1988. He left documentary film making in 1991 and his first feature film All Night Long was released in 1992. The film earned him the Best New Director award at the 1993 Yokohama Film Festival.

He followed up his first feature with the 1995 horror film Concrete-Encased High School Girl Murder Case, based on a true crime, the 1988 murder of Junko Furuta. Matsumura continued the "All Night Long" series with two more installments released directly to video in 1995 and 1996, followed by the 4th and 5th chapters later in 2002 and 2003, also on video.

Matsumura returned to feature films with the 2004 horror movie Ki-re-i?, based on the novel by Kei Yuikawa, which combines cosmetic surgery and gore, and in 2008, he directed Dark Love: Rape, an erotic psycho-thriller from the manga series  by Shūichi Sakabe. The film was produced and distributed by the adult video (AV) studio KM Produce and featured one of their former actresses Hitomi Hayasaka.

In 2009, Matsumura brought out All Night Long 6, produced by Takashi Shimizu, famous for his Ju-on (The Grudge) films, and with special makeup effects by Yoshihiro Nishimura. The film was shown February 28, 2009 at the Yubari International Fantastic Film Festival.

Filmography
Sources:
 , 1992
 , 1995
 , 1995 (video)
 , 1996 (video)
 , 2002 (video)
 , 2003 (video)
 , 2004
 , 2008
 , 2009

Sources

Notes

Japanese film directors
Japanese screenwriters
1963 births
Living people
Writers from Tokyo